The 2004–05 NSW Premier League season was the fourth season of the revamped NSW Premier League.

Throughout the season many Premier League, Super League, Division One and Division Two teams competed in a newly formed FA Cup-style knockout competition called the Statewide Cup in which the Sydney United were crowned champions after defeating Belconnen Blue Devils in 3–1 at Parramatta Stadium.

Changes from Previous Season
The number of teams increased from 12 to 16, with the inclusion of former National Soccer League teams following the abolishment of that league in favour of the restructured A-League. These teams included Marconi Stallions, Sydney Olympic, Sydney United and Wollongong Wolves. Manly United were also promoted from the NSW Super League. There was also a significant change to the format. The competition was divided into two stages. The first stage consisted of fifteen rounds with each of the sixteen teams playing each other once. The top eight sides would enter the Champions League and the bottom sides the Challengers League. All eight teams in each league would play a further seven matches against those from their league. All points accrued from the first stage would be retained for the second stage to determine the final table positions. Positions one to four from the Champions League and the highest ranked from the Challengers League would compete in the finals series. The bottom three teams in the Challengers League were relegated for the 2006 NSW Super League season.

Teams
Teams relegated from National Soccer League:
(After the end of the 2003–04 season)
 Marconi Stallions
 Sydney Olympic
 Sydney United
 Wollongong Wolves

Teams promoted from Super League:
(After the end of the 2004 season.)
 Manly United FC

Teams relegated to Super League:
(After the end of the 2003–04 season.)
 Canterbury-Marrickville

Teams and locations

Regular season

League table

Champions League

Challengers League

Finals series

Week 1 Finals

Semi-finals

Preliminary final

Grand final

See also
NSW Premier League
Football NSW

References

External links
NSW Premier League Official website

2004 in Australian soccer
2005 in Australian soccer
New South Wales Premier League seasons
Nsw Premier League Season, 2003–04